This is a list of High Sheriffs of Flintshire.

The High Sheriff is the oldest secular office under the Crown. Formerly, the High Sheriff was the principal law enforcement officer in the county, but over the centuries most of the responsibilities associated with the post have been transferred elsewhere or are now defunct, so that its functions are now largely ceremonial. The High Sheriff changes every March. The shrievalty of Flintshire, together with that of Denbighshire, was abolished in 1974 when the county and shrievalty of Clwyd was created.

List of Sheriffs

14th and 15th centuries
1309–11: Pain de Tipetot (Tiptoft)
1331: Robert de Praers(?)
1341?: William de Praers
1349-58: Rhys ap Roppert ap Gruffydd and Ithel ap Cynwrig Sais
<1373: Adam de Kyngeslegh 
1373–1378: Ralph de Davenport 
1378: Morgan 'Yonge' ab Iorwerth ap Morgan 
1390: Hywel ap Tudur ab Ithel Fychan 
1396(-1399?): Nicholas Hauberk 
1399: Henry Hotspur Percy (killed 1403)
1407–1416: Roger Leche
1417–1458: Thomas Rempston

16th century

17th century

18th century

19th century

20th century

References

 
Flintshire
Flintshire